Augusta Bay (Norwegian: Augustabukta) is a bay of Nordaustlandet, Svalbard archipelago, Norway.

Its mouth is open to the Hinlopen Strait. It is located in the southwestern part of the island, southern part of its Scaniahalvøya (Scania Peninsula).

External links
Detailed map of Nordaustlandet

Bays of Svalbard
Nordaustlandet